Black Science is a creator-owned science fiction American comic book series by Rick Remender and Italian artist Matteo Scalera. Image Comics released the first issue in November 2013. The story follows Grant McKay, an ex-member of the Anarchist Order of Scientists, and his team and family as they are thrown through dimensions as they try to repair his dimensional device, "the Pillar", created by forbidden, unethical means – the eponymous "Black Science". Via the Pillar, McKay and his fellow "Dimensionauts" were able to leap between worlds to find technological and medical advances for their own, but a member of Grant's team sabotages the pillar, causing it to jump to random locations at random times in increasingly lethal and hostile dimensions, forcing the team to try to return to their own dimension before they are killed by numerous hazards, ranging from parasitic fungi, nihilistic dimensional conquerors, and alternate versions of themselves.

The first several issues of Black Science sold out of first printings at the distributor level, and Image announced that certain issues would be reprinted.

Synopsis

Grant McKay, former member of The Anarchistic Order of Scientists, has finally done the impossible: He has deciphered Black Science and punched through the barriers of reality. Grant theorizes that each alternate reality of what he calls the "Eververse" is like an onion. Pierce into each and you discover a new dimension, one based an infinite variety of choices made by everyone everywhere. What lies at the center is perhaps the primal universe that started it all. What lies beyond the veil is not epiphany, however, but chaos. Now Grant and his team are lost; living ghosts shipwrecked on an infinite ocean of alien worlds, barreling through the long-forgotten, ancient, and unimaginable dark realms.

Characters

Chandra – Second in command to Kadir.
Grant McKay – Member of the Anarchist League of Scientists, father of Nathan and Pia McKay.
Kadir – Bankrolled the Pillar project, often at odds with head scientist Grant McKay.
Nathan McKay – Grant McKay's son, stranded with him in another dimension after the sabotage of the Pillar.
Pia McKay – Grant McKay's daughter, stranded with him in another dimension after the sabotage of the Pillar.
Rebecca – Scientist who worked on The Pillar and began an affair with Grant McKay.
Sara McKay – Grant McKay's wife.
Shawn – Junior scientist on the Pillar project for the Anarchistic Order of Scientists.
Ward – Ex-military, now security officer for the Anarchistic Order of Scientists and Grant McKay.
The Shaman – A medicine man from a dimension where Germany and highly technically advanced Native Americans are at war, who is abducted by, then later joins the Dimensionauts.

Collected editions

References

External links 
 Black Science at Image Comics
 Black Science at Comic Vine

Image Comics titles
2013 comics debuts
Comics by Rick Remender
Comics publications